The Lanitz Escapade One is a German ultralight aircraft produced by Lanitz Aviation. When it was available the aircraft was supplied complete and ready-to-fly.

By March 2018 the aircraft was no longer advertised on the company website and production has likely ended.

Design and development
The Escape One was developed from the British Escapade Kid, which was in turn derived from the Flying K Sky Raider, an aircraft which in turn traces its origins to the Denney Kitfox. The Escapade One was designed to comply with the Fédération Aéronautique Internationale microlight rules. It features a strut-braced high-wing, a single-seat enclosed cockpit, fixed conventional landing gear and a single engine in tractor configuration.

The aircraft fuselage is made from welded steel, while the wing has an aluminum spar and wooden ribs. The aircraft is covered in Oratex UL 600 aircraft fabric. The standard engine available is the German  Lanitz 3W 342 iB2 TS two-stroke powerplant.

The wing can be folded in two minutes for ground transport on a trailer or for storage.

Specifications (Escapade One)

References

External links
Official website

2000s German ultralight aircraft
Single-engined tractor aircraft